Hatay Büyükşehir Belediye Men Volleyball is the men volleyball section of Hatay Büyükşehir Belediyespor, a major sports club in Hatay, Turkey.

Previous names 
Antakya Belediyesi (2011–2014)
Hatay Büyükşehir Belediyespor (2014–present)

League performances

References

Sport in Antakya